The 1899 Normal School of Arizona Normals football team was an American football team that represented the Normal School of Arizona (later renamed Arizona State University) as an independent during the 1899 college football season. In its second season of varsity football (an 1897 team played one game), the Normals compiled a 3–0 record. The team captain was Walter Shute. The team was known by the nickname "Normals".

The season began with the first two victories in program history, one over the Phoenix Indian School, and the other over Phoenix High School. On November 30, 1899, the team played and won its first intercollegiate football game, an 11–2 victory over the University of Arizona.  The game was the inaugural meeting in the Arizona–Arizona State football rivalry and was played in front of an estimated 300 spectators at the Carillo Gardens amusement center near the Santa Cruz River in Tucson.

Schedule

References

Normal School
Arizona State Sun Devils football seasons
College football undefeated seasons
Normal School of Arizona Normals football